The following is a list of notable persons of Yazidi descent.

A 
Ali Atalan, politician
Arab Shamilov, novelist
Amar Suloev, mixed martial artist, hitman
Amin Farhan Jejo, Yazidi politician and author
Ibrahim Khalil, The Yazidi folk singer and songwriter
Aslan Usoyan, Russian mafia boss
Al-Hasan ibn Adi, religious heir of ‘Adī ibn Sakhr
Amirkhan Mori, owner and chairman of the Regions Group
Aziz Tamoyan,was the president of the Yezidi National Union
Sheikh Ali Ilyas is the current Baba Sheikh (religious leader) of the Yazidi community since November 2020

D 
Dalal Khario, Women's Rights Award recipient, former captive of ISIS

E 
Emerîkê Serdar, journalist, writer, translator
Emine Evdal, writer, linguist and poet
Eskerê Boyîk, poet and writer
Ezidi Mîrza, 17th century governor of Mosul, Yezidi leader and hero

F 
Fakhr ad-Din ibn Adi, Yezidi saint 
Farida Khalaf, former ISIS captive

G 
Guram Adzhoyev, former footballer

H 
Hazim Tahsin Beg, current Yezidi leader
Hemoyê Shero, nineteenth century Yezidi tribal leader
Heciyê Cindî, linguist and researcher
Heydar Şeşo, founder and supreme commander of the Yazidi self-defense militia Protection Force of Ezidkhan
Khdr Hajoyan, President of the Yezidi National Union, chief executive officer of "Ezdikhana" newspaper.

J 
Jalile Jalil, historian, writer and Kurdologist
Jangir Agha, national hero

K 
Khalil Rashow, academic, writer and researcher
Khanna Omarkhali (Xana Omarxali), academic, writer and researcher focusing mainly on Yazidism
Khurto Hajji Ismail, current Baba Sheikh of the Yazidi 
Kseniya Borodina (paternal side), television presenter and actress
Kyaram Sloyan, soldier killed and beheaded by Azerbaijani soldiers

L 
Lamiya Aji Bashar, human rights activist

M 
Mahmoud Ezidi, Peshmerga fighter
Misha Aloyan, boxer
Meyan Khatun, Yazidi princess
Mir Tahsin Saied Beg, current hereditary leader (Mīr, or prince) of the Yazidi people
Mir Jafar Dasni, launched an uprising in 838
Mahma Xelil, mayor of Sinjar in Nineveh Province, Iraq.

N 
Nadia Murad, human rights activist, Nobel Peace Prize recipient

O 
Ordîxanê Celîl, writer and academic

P 

 Pîr Xidir Silêman, writer, teacher and parliamentarian

R 
Roman Amoyan, Greco-Roman wrestler, Olympian

S 
Sheikh Adi ibn Musafir, Shaykh
Sakhr Abu l-Barakat, Shaykh
Sheikh Sharaf ad-Din ibn al-Hasan, Shaykh
Sheikh Khairy Khedr, Commander and founder of the Yazidi militia Malik Al-Tawus Troop
Samand Siabandov, hero of the Soviet Union
Shir Sarim, Yazidi leader who led an uprising against Safavid Persia during the reign of Shah Ismail I.
Sheikh Ali Ilyas, current Baba Shekh
Souzan Barakat, Yazidi girl, murder victim

T 
Têmûrê Xelîl, journalist, writer and translator
Tosinê Reşîd, writer, poet and playwright

U 

 Usuv Beg, 19th and 20th century Yezidi leader in Armenia

V 
Vian Dakhil, member of the Iraqi parliament

W 
Wansa, Yazidi princess

X 
Xelîlê Çaçan Mûradov, writer and journalist

Z 
Zara Mgoyan, pop singer, actress and social activist
Zakhar Kalashov, Russian mafia boss
Ismail Özden, Yezidi PKK commander in Shingal.

References

See also 
Nineveh Governorate
List of Yazidi settlements 
Genocide of Yazidis by ISIL
List of Yazidi organizations

Yazidi
Yazidi